Listed below is a complete list of the Pan American Games records in swimming, ratified by the Pan American Sports Organization (PASO).

Men

Women

Mixed relay

See also
Swimming at the Pan American Games

References

Pan American Games
Records
Records
Swimming